Joseph Villiet (August 10, 1823 – July 10, 1877) was a French master stained glass artist born in Ébreuil, France. He trained at the atelier of Émile Thibaud and Étienne Thevenot, at Clermont-Ferrand. In 1852, he relocated to Bordeaux where he worked until his death in 1877.

Villiet became a member of the Bordeaux Imperial Academy of Sciences, Literature and Arts in 1859. The same year, he published an essay on the history of murals in the academy's collections.

Notable works 

Most of Villiet's stained glass work is found in southeast France, as well as in Allier, Loiret, Manche, Puy-de-Dôme, and Paris.

 Cathédrale Saint-André de Bordeaux : Multiple stained glass installations (chapels of Saint-Joseph, Notre-Dame du Mont-Carmel, de l'Annonciation, Sainte-Anne, Sainte-Marguerite, Saint-Charles-Borromée, du Sacré-Cœur)
 Cathédrale Saint-Étienne de Cahors
 Cathédrale Saint-Jean-Baptiste de Bazas (Gironde, 1852–1862)
 Église Notre-Dame de Nérac (Lot-et-Garonne).
 Église Saint-Nicolas de Nérac (Lot-et-Garonne, 1856–1868)
 Église d'Isle-Saint-Georges (Gironde)
 Église Saint-Joseph d'Albi
 Église Saint-Paulin de Carbon-Blanc (Gironde) : vitraux de la nef et des tribunes (1872-1877)
 Église Saint-Sauveur de Castelsarrasin (Tarn-et-Garonne)
 Prieuré de bénédictins de Marmande (Lot-et-Garonne)

See also

References 

1823 births
1877 deaths
French stained glass artists and manufacturers
People from Allier